Mount Rifenburgh is a mountain, 2,690 m, standing 2 nautical miles (3.7 km) east of the head of Davidson Glacier in the Holland Range. Mapped by the United States Geological Survey (USGS) from tellurometer surveys (1961–62) and Navy air photos (1960). Named by Advisory Committee on Antarctic Names (US-ACAN) for Captain E. Rifenburgh, U.S. Navy, Commanding Officer of the USS Arneb during U.S. Navy Operation Deepfreeze 1963.
 

Mountains of the Ross Dependency
Shackleton Coast